Contempt of Congress is the act of obstructing the work of the United States Congress or one of its committees. Historically, the bribery of a U.S. senator or U.S. representative was considered contempt of Congress. In modern times, contempt of Congress has generally applied to the refusal to comply with a subpoena issued by a congressional committee or subcommittee—usually seeking to compel either testimony or the production of requested documents.

History 
In the late 1790s, declaring contempt of Congress was considered an "implied power" of the legislature, in a similar manner as the British Parliament could make findings of contempt of Parliament—early Congresses issued contempt citations against numerous individuals for a variety of actions. Some instances of contempt of Congress included citations against:
 Robert Randal, for an attempt to bribe Representative William Smith of South Carolina in 1795.
 William Duane, a newspaper editor who refused to answer Senate questions in 1800.
 Nathaniel Rounsavell, another newspaper editor, for releasing sensitive information to the press in 1812.

In Anderson v. Dunn (1821), the Supreme Court of the United States held that Congress' power to hold someone in contempt was essential to ensure that Congress was "... not exposed to every indignity and interruption that rudeness, caprice, or even conspiracy, may mediate against it."
The historical interpretation that bribery of a senator or representative was considered contempt of Congress has long since been abandoned in favor of criminal statutes. In 1857, Congress enacted a law that made "contempt of Congress" a criminal offense against the United States.

In the Air Mail Scandal of 1934, William MacCracken, former Assistant Secretary of Commerce for Aeronautics, was sentenced to ten days of detention for destroying evidence under subpoena. MacCracken appealed his sentence to the Supreme Court in Jurney v. MacCracken. After losing his case, he surrendered to Chelsey Jurney, Senate sergeant at arms, who detained him in a room at the Willard Hotel.

While it has been said that "Congress is handcuffed in getting obstinate witnesses to comply", cases have been referred to the United States Department of Justice. The Office of Legal Counsel has asserted that the President of the United States is protected from contempt by executive privilege.

Subpoenas 
The Supreme Court affirmed in Watkins v. United States (1957) that "[the] power of the Congress to conduct investigations is inherent in the legislative process" and that "[it] is unquestionably the duty of all citizens to cooperate with the Congress in its efforts to obtain the facts needed for intelligent legislative action. It is their unremitting obligation to respond to subpoenas, to respect the dignity of the Congress and its committees and to testify fully with respect to matters within the province of proper investigation." Congressional rules empower all its standing committees with the authority to compel witnesses to produce testimony and documents for subjects under its jurisdiction. Committee rules may provide for the full committee to issue a subpoena, or permit subcommittees or the chairman (acting alone or with the ranking member) to issue subpoenas.

As announced in Wilkinson v. United States (1961), a congressional committee must meet three requirements for its subpoenas to be "legally sufficient." First, the committee's investigation of the broad subject area must be authorized by its chamber; second, the investigation must pursue "a valid legislative purpose" but does not need to involve legislation and does not need to specify the ultimate intent of Congress; and third, the specific inquiries must be pertinent to the subject matter area that has been authorized for investigation.

The Court held in Eastland v. United States Servicemen's Fund (1975) that congressional subpoenas are within the scope of the Speech or Debate clause which provides "an absolute bar to judicial interference" once it is determined that Members are acting within the "legitimate legislative sphere" with such compulsory process. Under that ruling, courts generally do not hear motions to quash congressional subpoenas; even when executive branch officials refuse to comply, courts tend to rule that such matters are "political questions" unsuitable for judicial remedy. In fact, many legal rights usually associated with a judicial subpoena do not apply to a congressional subpoena. For example, attorney–client privilege and information that is normally protected under the Trade Secrets Act do not need to be recognized.

Procedures 
Following the refusal of a witness to produce documents or to testify, the committee is entitled to report a resolution of contempt to its parent chamber. A committee may also cite a person for contempt but not immediately report the resolution to the floor. In the case of subcommittees, they report the resolution of contempt to the full committee, which then has the option of rejecting it, accepting it but not reporting it to the floor, or accepting it and reporting it to the floor of the chamber for action. On the floor of the House or the Senate, the reported resolution is considered privileged and, if the resolution of contempt is passed, the chamber has several options to enforce its mandate.

Inherent contempt 
Under this process, the procedure for holding a person in contempt involves only the chamber concerned. Following a contempt citation, the person cited is arrested by the Sergeant-at-Arms for the House or Senate, brought to the floor of the chamber, held to answer charges by the presiding officer, and then subjected to punishment as the chamber may dictate (usually imprisonment for punishment, imprisonment for coercion, or release from the contempt citation).

Concerned with the time-consuming nature of a contempt proceeding and the inability to extend punishment further than the session of the Congress concerned (under Supreme Court rulings), Congress created a statutory process in 1857. While Congress retains its "inherent contempt" authority and may exercise it at any time, this inherent contempt process was last used by the Senate in 1934, in a Senate investigation of airlines and the U.S. Postmaster.  After a one-week trial on the Senate floor (presided over by Vice President John Nance Garner, in his capacity as Senate President), William P. MacCracken Jr., a lawyer and former Assistant Secretary of Commerce for Aeronautics who was charged with allowing clients to remove or rip up subpoenaed documents, was found guilty and sentenced to 10 days imprisonment.

MacCracken filed a petition of habeas corpus in federal courts to overturn his arrest, but after litigation, the U.S. Supreme Court ruled that Congress had acted constitutionally, and denied the petition in the case Jurney v. MacCracken.

Statutory proceedings 

Following a contempt citation, the presiding officer of the chamber is instructed to refer the matter to the U.S. Attorney for the District of Columbia; according to the law it is the duty of the U.S. Attorney to refer the matter to a grand jury for action.

The criminal offense of contempt of Congress sets the penalty at not less than one month nor more than twelve months in jail and a fine of not more than $100,000 or less than $100.

Civil procedures 
Senate Rules authorize the Senate to direct the Senate Legal Counsel to file a civil action against any private individual found in contempt.  Upon motion by the Senate, the federal district court issues another order for a person to comply with Senate process. If the subject then refuses to comply with the Court's order, the person may be cited for contempt of court and may incur sanctions imposed by the Court. The process has been used at least six times.

Partial list of those held in contempt since 1975

See also 
 Contempt of court
 The Hollywood Ten
 Separation of powers under the United States Constitution

References

External links 
 
 

Legislative branch of the United States government
Law of the United States